The 2013 Belarusian Super Cup was held on 17 March 2013 between the 2012 Belarusian Premier League champions winners BATE Borisov and the 2011–12 Belarusian Cup winners Naftan Novopolotsk. BATE won the match 1–0 and won the trophy for the third time.

Match details

See also
2012 Belarusian Premier League
2011–12 Belarusian Cup

References

Belarusian Super Cup
Super
Belarusian Super Cup 2013